The Pine River is a  tributary of the Mississippi River in northern Minnesota, United States.

It rises in Cass County at the outlet of Pine Mountain Lake, southeast of Backus, and takes a winding route generally southeast. It passes the city of Pine River and flows into Crow Wing County, where it enters Upper and then Lower Whitefish Lake, followed by Rush Lake and Cross Lake.

Pine River is an English translation of the Ojibwe language name.

See also
List of rivers of Minnesota

References

Minnesota Watersheds
USGS Geographic Names Information Service
USGS Hydrologic Unit Map - State of Minnesota (1974)

Rivers of Minnesota
Tributaries of the Mississippi River
Rivers of Cass County, Minnesota
Rivers of Crow Wing County, Minnesota